Althepus suhartoi is a species of spider of the genus Althepus, named after Suharto. It is endemic to Sumatra in Indonesia.

References

Psilodercidae
Endemic fauna of Sumatra
Spiders of Indonesia
Spiders described in 1985